Mirjam Tuokkola (born 7 February 1997) is a Finnish archer who participated in the 2014 Summer Youth Olympics.

She started archery in 2007 and her other career highlights include a silver medal in the 2012 World Field Archery Championships in Junior Women's Recurve and several other Finnish championships in different age categories. Her club is Teuvan Jousiampujat.

She broke the Finnish youth record with a score of 633 and won bronze in the mixed international team event with Canadian Eric Peters. In the girls' individual event, she was eliminated in round 32.

Her aim for the 2015 archery season was to qualify for the 2016 Summer Olympics. She also planned to prepare for the 2020 Summer Olympics.

Sources 
 Personal website 
 World Archery biography

1997 births
Living people
Finnish female archers
Archers at the 2014 Summer Youth Olympics